The Nehru jacket is a hip-length tailored coat for men or women, with a mandarin collar, and with its front modelled on the Indian achkan or sherwani, a garment worn by Jawaharlal Nehru, the prime minister of India from 1947 to 1964.

History 

The Nehru jacket is a variation of the Jodhpuri where the material is often khadi (hand-woven cloth). The Jodhpuri itself is an evolution from the Angarkha. Popularized during the terms of Jawaharlal Nehru, these distinct Bandhgalas made from khadi remain popular to this day.

Style 

Unlike the achkan, which falls somewhere below the knees of the wearer, the Nehru jacket is shorter. Jawaharlal Nehru, notably, never wore this type of Nehru jacket.

Popularity 
The jacket began to be marketed as the Nehru jacket in Europe and America in the mid 1960s. It was briefly popular there in the late 1960s and early 1970s, its popularity spurred by the aspirational class' growing awareness of foreign cultures, by the minimalism of the Mod lifestyle and, in particular, by Sammy Davis Jr., the Beatles. Some were also worn by Roger Delgado's version of the renegade Time Lord known as the Master on the science fiction Doctor Who.

Charles Barron, Mahathir Mohamad are among the politicians who frequently wear Nehru suits.

In 2012, Nehru jacket was listed among the Top 10 Political Fashion Statements by Jared T. Miller in the Time magazine.

See also 
 Sari
 Mao suit
 Mujib Coat
 Gakuran
 Raj pattern
 Abacost
 Kariba suit
 Leisure suit
 Madiba shirt

References

Notes

Citations 

Indian clothing
History of fashion
1960s fashion
1960s fads and trends
2000s fashion
Monuments and memorials to Jawaharlal Nehru
Jackets
Lounge jackets